La Amistad is a district of the Pérez Zeledón canton, in the San José province of Costa Rica.

History 
La Amistad was created on 5 December 2014 by cuerdo Ejecutivo N° 67-2014-MGP. Segregated from districts Platanares and Pejibaye.

Geography 
La Amistad has an area of  km² and an elevation of  metres.

Demographics 

For the 2011 census, La Amistad had not been created, therefore census data is not available, as the current inhabitants were part of Platanares and Pejibaye districts.

Transportation

Road transportation 
The district is covered by the following road routes:
 National Route 332

References 

Districts of San José Province
Populated places in San José Province